Garden Oaks is a neighborhood in Houston, Texas (USA). The neighborhood, located north of Houston Heights, was established in 1937 by Edward L. Crain.

Garden Oaks has many oak, pecan, and pine trees in and around the neighborhood. Several types of houses, including ranch-style houses and bungalows, are in the neighborhood.

History
Garden Oaks was established in 1937 by Edward L. Crain.

Around 1995, the population of children living in Garden Oaks was quickly growing.  Houstonia magazine stated that, beginning in 2000, Garden Oaks began attracting "creative types", who wanted to establish families or who could not afford the Houston Heights or Montrose.

In 2010, Richard Connelly of the Houston Press said that Garden Oaks "used to be an underrated neighborhood but now is on everyone's radar." In 2013, Houstonia stated that Garden Oaks was one of the "25 Hottest Neighborhoods" in Houston; it stated that Garden Oaks was "wealthier and more developed" than Oak Forest but that the latter was also becoming popular.

Government and infrastructure

Local government 
Garden Oaks is in Houston City Council District C.

The area is within the Houston Police Department's North Patrol Division with headquarters at 9455 West Montgomery Road. The Near North Storefront is located at 1335 West 43rd Street.

County, state, and federal representation
Garden Oaks is within Harris County Precinct 4. As of 2008, Jerry Eversole heads the precinct. Patrol services are contracted to the Harris County Precinct 1 Constable's Office. Harris County Hospital District operates the Northwest Health Center at 1100 West 34th Street.

The United States Postal Service Garden Oaks Post Office is located at 3816 North Shepherd Drive.

Harris Health System (formerly Harris County Hospital District) designated Northwest Health Center for the ZIP code 77018. The nearest public hospital is Ben Taub General Hospital in the Texas Medical Center.

Education 

The neighborhood is served by the Houston Independent School District (HISD). The community is within Trustee District I, represented by Anna Eastman as of 2009.

Most residents are zoned to Garden Oaks Montessori Magnet School, formerly Garden Oaks Elementary School, while a few are zoned to Durham Elementary School. Garden Oaks School is in Section 2.

By 1995, a Montessori program established at Garden Oaks Elementary became popular in the neighborhood, and there were fewer spaces available than willing applicants. In 2010, Terry Grier, the superintendent of HISD, proposed making Garden Oaks an all-Montessori school, with the condition that it gets the necessary federal funding. As a result, some parents protested the proposal. The proposal and the political debate divided the Garden Oaks community. In order to expand the Montessori program to all students, the school received a grant from the Magnet School Assistance Program, a federal government program. As part of the 2012 bond, there were plans to renovate and expand the Garden Oaks Montessori building. The total cost was $26.6 million.

All residents are zoned to Frank Black Middle School . Most residents are zoned to Waltrip High School, while some are zoned to Booker T. Washington High School.

Lutheran High School North, a private school, is in the area.

Parochial schools in the neighborhood, of the Roman Catholic Archdiocese of Galveston-Houston include St. Rose of Lima and St. Ambrose, Catholic K-8 schools, and St. Pius X High School.

Parks and recreation 
The Northwest Branch YMCA is the closest YMCA to Garden Oaks. The Garden Oaks Montessori Spark Park is located adjacent to the school at 901 Sue Barnett Dr. and was recently revamped in July 2020, adding new soccer goals, benches, a new and relocated backstop, and re-paved quarter-mile track.

Media
The local weekly newspaper The Leader is distributed to Garden Oaks, as well as The Garden Oaks Gazette.

The Houston Chronicle is the citywide paper.

References

External links

 Garden Oaks
 Northwest Corner
 Garden Oaks Elementary School

Neighborhoods in Houston